Shuko Aoyama and Chang Kai-chen were the defending champions, but decided not to participate this year.

Tímea Babos and Chan Hao-ching won the title, defeating Chan Yung-jan and Zheng Saisai in the final, 6–3, 6–4.

Seeds

Draw

Draw

References
Main draw

Malaysian Open
Malaysian Open (tennis)